The 1963 Kentucky gubernatorial election was held on November 5, 1963. Democratic nominee Ned Breathitt defeated Republican nominee Louie Nunn with 50.74% of the vote.

Primary elections
Primary elections were held on May 28, 1963.

Democratic primary

Candidates
Ned Breathitt, former  State Representative
Happy Chandler, former Governor
Mary Louise Foust, former Kentucky State Auditor
Wilton Benge Cupp

Results

Republican primary

Candidates
Louie Nunn, former Barren County judge
Jesse N. R. Cecil

Results

General election

Candidates
Ned Breathitt, Democratic
Louie Nunn, Republican

Results

References

1963
Kentucky
Gubernatorial
November 1963 events in the United States